Leonard W. Buck (July 8, 1834 - June 4, 1895) was an American businessman, rancher and politician.

Early life
Leonard W. Buck was born on July 8, 1834, in Truxton, New York. He was educated at the Courtland Academy in Homer, New York. During the American Civil War, he served as a Lieutenant in Company H, 175th New York Infantry Regiment from 1862 to 1863.

Career
Buck was a salesman of hardware goods in Clinton, Iowa from 1865 to 1873.

Buck established a ranch in Vacaville, California in 1874. He also established a ranch in Lodi, California (400 acres purchased from B.F. Langford in 1887). He grew fruit, especially tokay grapes and peaches. Buck pioneered the fruit shipping industry and is credited with sending California fruit to east coast markets.

Buck served in the California State Senate. He founded the California Fruit Union in 1885 (disbanded in 1894) and served as Vice President of the California State Board of Horticulture. Additionally, he served on the board of directors of the Bank of Vacaville.

Personal life
Buck married Anna M. Bellows in 1856. They had two sons: Frank H. Buck and Fred M. Buck, and three daughters, Mrs J. B. Corey, Emma L. Buck and Anna M. Buck. They resided at 929 Adeline Street in Oakland, California from 1887 onward.

Buck was a Freemason, and he served as the master of the Vacaville lodge in 1884. He often used the pen name "Nel" (Len spelled backwards) in personal writings. Emma Buck and Mrs. Bellows sustained bruising after they were accidentally thrown from a horse and buggy in 1880.

Death
Buck was accidentally thrown from a horse and buggy on June 3, 1895, at the intersection of 12th Street and Castro Street in Oakland, California. He suffered a fractured skull in the accident and died of a cerebral hemorrhage the next day at his home in Oakland, California. He was buried at the Mountain View Cemetery in Oakland. By the time of his death, he was worth an estimated US$300,000.

References

External links

Join California Leonard W. Buck

1834 births
1895 deaths
People from Truxton, New York
People from Vacaville, California
People from Lodi, California
People from Oakland, California
Union Army officers
Businesspeople from California
Ranchers from California
Democratic Party California state senators
American Freemasons
19th-century American politicians
Burials at Mountain View Cemetery (Oakland, California)
Accidental deaths in California
Military personnel from California